Mieczysław Wasilewski (born 1942) is a Polish graphic designer.

He Studied at the Warsaw Academy of Fine Arts.  He taught graphic design at the University of Damascus 1981 - 1982.  He has a professorship at the Warsaw Academy of Fine Arts in the Department of Graphic Arts.

Major awards
1976 - Gold Medal, 6th International Poster Biennale, Warsaw (Poland)
1989 - Silver Medal, 13th Biennal of Polish Poster, Katowice (Poland)
1991 - Special Jury Prize, 2nd Poster Festival, Chaumont (France)
1994 - Silver Medal, 14th International Poster Biennale, Warsaw (Poland)

See also
List of graphic designers
List of Polish painters
List of Polish graphic designers
Graphic design

External links
Mieczyslaw Wasilewski's Posters at Polish poster gallery
Mieczyslaw Wasilewski Polish Poster Gallery - Poster.pl
Contemporary Posters - Mieczyslaw Wasilewski's Posters
Rene Wanner's Poster Page

1942 births
Living people
Polish graphic designers
Polish poster artists